Rock Mountain could refer to these places in the United States of America:

Rock Mountain (Georgia)
Rock Mountain (Washington state), in the Central Cascade Range
Rock Mountain (Wyoming), Albany County, Wyoming